Errisbeg Mountain or Errisbeg is a hill in Roundstone, County Galway, in the West of Ireland, with a height of 300 m.

The summit has views of both the Roundstone bog and the Atlantic. On a clear day the Aran Islands are visible to the south and Clifden and the Twelve Bens to the North.

References

Marilyns of Ireland
Hewitts of Ireland
Mountains and hills of County Galway
Connemara